A Place Like This is the debut extended play by Canadian R&B duo Majid Jordan. It was released on July 17, 2014, digitally through OVO Sound, the record label co-founded by rapper Drake. The EP consists of five songs and is available for purchase on iTunes.

Release
On July 7, 2014, Majid Jordan released the first single "A Place Like This" from their EP that goes by the same name. Alongside the release of their first single as a duo, the EP was made available for pre-order on the iTunes Store. The EP was scheduled to be released July 22 in Canada and the United States but was pushed forward because of the earlier release date in Australia and New Zealand. On July 17, 2014, the EP was released on iTunes and Spotify. On December 8, 2014 the music video for "Her" was released. The video sees the duo take a simple black-and-white approach while being surrounded by scantily-clad women.

Track listing

Personnel
Credits for A Place Like This adapted from AllMusic.

 Majid Jordan – primary artist

Release history

References

External links
 

2014 debut EPs
Majid Jordan EPs
Albums produced by Majid Jordan
OVO Sound EPs
Warner Records EPs